Frank Phillips (May 2, 1862 – September 16, 1926) was a member of the Missouri House of Representatives.

Early life
Frank Phillips was born on May 2, 1862, in Independence, Missouri. He attended public schools there.

Career
At the age of eighteen, Phillips became a conductor for the street railway company. In 1888, Phillips was made the supervisor of the Tenth Street and Brooklyn Avenue line.

Phillips was a Democrat. Phillips was elected to the Kansas City, Missouri City Council for two terms. He then served as a member of the Kansas House of Representatives.

Personal life
Phillips married and had one child, Robert F. (or Frank F), sources differ.

Phillips died on September 16, 1926, at his home, 3416 Michigan Avenue, in Kansas City, Missouri. He was buried at Mount Saint Mary's Cemetery in Kansas City.

References

External links

1862 births
1926 deaths
People from Independence, Missouri
Democratic Party members of the Missouri House of Representatives